Lauren Grace Pope (born 29 September 1982) is an English model, television personality and DJ. In 2010, she began appearing in the ITVBe reality series The Only Way Is Essex. She left the series in March 2019.

Career

Television
In 2004, Pope appeared in the second series of Mile High for two episodes. In October 2010, she began appearing in the ITVBe reality series The Only Way Is Essex. Pope left the series in October 2015 to pursue business endeavours, but announced her return 18 months later. Pope returned to the series in 2018, but announced her departure again in 2019.

Music
In 2007, Pope began a career as a DJ. Nuts magazine named her the "world's sexiest DJ". Since becoming a DJ, Pope has also become involved in producing. Pope also appears in the music video for the song "Ready for the Weekend" by Calvin Harris.

Business ventures
In 2007, Pope designed and launched her own brand of clip-in hair extensions, Hair Rehab London, appearing on the ITV reality series Tycoon. The show saw Peter Jones search for entrepreneurs with ideas that he helped turn into profitable companies, while the eventual winner was chosen by the public. Pope came fourth out of the six contestants, but continued to work with Jones after the show, which expanded her business. In 2014, Pope collaborated with In The Style to launch the High Summer collection. In 2018, Pope released another range of hair extensions with her brand, Hair Rehab London.

Personal life
In March 2020, Pope announced that she was pregnant with her first child. She announced that she had given birth on 11 July 2020 to a daughter named Raine Anais Keterman. In February 2022, Pope announced that she was pregnant with her second child. She announced that she had given birth on 15 June 2022, to a daughter named Leni Star Keterman.

Filmography

References

External links
 

1982 births
English DJs
English television personalities
Glamour models
Living people
Musicians from Torquay
Mass media people from Torquay